The Dream SMP (sometimes abbreviated as the DSMP and originally known as the Dream Team SMP) was an invite-only survival multiplayer (SMP) Minecraft server. Created by YouTubers Dream and GeorgeNotFound, they roleplayed alongside many fellow Minecraft content creators as fictionalized versions of themselves within a loose overarching storyline. Livestreamed by participants on Twitch and YouTube, it was the subject of one of the most popular Minecraft web series.

History and plot 

The Dream SMP was created by Dream and GeorgeNotFound in April or May 2020 as a small server for a few friends. It quickly gained popularity, in part due to the COVID-19 pandemic and collaborations across various Twitch channels. It starred fellow Minecraft YouTubers such as Sapnap and TommyInnit, who roleplayed as characters loosely based on themselves. They engaged in lengthy conflicts over political power and rare artifacts.

Most content was improvised, apart from major plot points which were loosely scripted in advance. Wilbur Soot, who planned many of the early story arcs, said in an interview for Insider, "I write up a series of plot hooks and points that should tie together, however we improv dialogue and comedy throughout to take us from point to point." The server has over 20 "eras" in its plotline and over 30 characters as of August 2021. The server's early storyline was inspired by Hamilton, and the musical was referenced many times by the server members.

Within the plot, characters could die up to three times before being permanently dead. Some members played multiple characters, including ghost versions of themselves.

The Disc Saga, the server's longest-running story arc, was a series of events centered around two rare music discs belonging to TommyInnit. Throughout the saga, Dream and other characters fought over ownership of the discs, and used them as leverage against each other. The Disc Saga concluded in January 2021, with Dream being imprisoned. TommyInnit's Twitch broadcast of the events peaked at over 650,000 viewers, making it the third-highest all-time concurrent viewer livestream on the platform.

Another conflict broke out when Wilbur Soot founded L'Manberg, an in-game breakaway state for non-American players. It seceded from the Greater Dream SMP nation and won a war for independence. L'Manberg would later hold a presidential election, which involved heated roleplay debates between the fictional political parties SWAG2020 and POG2020. When SWAG2020 running mate GeorgeNotFound failed to show up, Quackity, the presidential candidate for the party, formed an impromptu coalition party with Jschlatt, SchWAG2020. This coalition party went on to win the election with 46 percent of the vote. In January 2021, L'Manberg would go on to be invaded, destroyed, and permanently disbanded.

The heavy emphasis on the roleplaying aspect of the server and their overarching plots attracted a lot of attention. According to Rich Stanton of PC Gamer, "L'Manburg was taken very seriously by its players, to the extent the nation has not only a flag but a national anthem." The plot was likened to live theater by Cecilia D'Anastasio of Wired, describing it as a "Machiavellian political drama". Ryan Broderick of Polygon described the server's plot as being played out like "a silly Game of Thrones with anime pacing", and described the story's characters as being "not unlike how the wrestler John Cena plays the wrestler John Cena inside the narrative of WWE". The Disc Saga was described by Julia Alexander of The Verge as a "dramatic tale of good versus evil" as Dream and TommyInnit fought over dominance in the server.

In a 2022 interview with Variety, Dream said that the Dream SMP was just Minecraft being used as a storytelling medium as opposed to being an actual game, with GeorgeNotFound adding they do not actually "really" play Minecraft when doing Dream SMP streams.

In November 2022, TommyInnit and Tubbo did four consecutive live streams on Twitch, starting on November 10 and ending on November 13, describing them as the Dream SMP season 1 finale. These four streams concluded with the server being blown up by Tubbo and Jack Manifold. The last part of the stream featured Dream, Tommyinnit, and Tubbo appearing on a new world with no memories of what had happened earlier in the stream. Tubbo later announced that all subsequent finale streams will end in the server blowing up, calling it "The Event." In the same stream, he hinted that season 2 may have references to season 1.

In March 2023, Dream announced that there would likely be no season 2; in response, CaptainPuffy uploaded over 300 images taken of locations on the server at various stages on her website.

List of Dream SMP flags

Cultural impact 
The Dream SMP has garnered a large following and a popular fandom, with hundreds of thousands of viewers turning up for live events. Its storylines are analyzed in documentary-style videos, such as those of MatPat, who describes the series as "narrative storytelling through the lens of gaming". Broderick also attributes the Dream SMP's unprecedented success to how its story is showcased, describing it as being "a profound idea [that] essentially turns viewers into their own directors, hopping through streams to see which version of the story they want to focus on". In September 2021, Benjamin Herold of The Hechinger Report said that the Dream SMP "helped millions of kids stay connected to the social world" during the COVID-19 pandemic.

The server's storylines have inspired fan art, fan fiction, and online musicals. Although unusual for an online creator, Dream has encouraged fan fiction to be written about him, stating that it ultimately helps his career. One notable fan creator is SAD-ist, an animator from the Philippines who illustrates events from the server's story set to music and dialogue clips.

An offhand joke post on Tumblr made at the expense of the Dream SMP fandom led to the creation of a fan-made server with its own plot and lore, known as "Penis SMP".

On July 24, 2021, the flag of L'Manberg was spotted at an anti-vaccine protest in London, next to a Donald Trump flag.

In popular culture
The Verge has described the Dream SMP as a "worldwide phenomenon", with Dream SMP fans creating mass amounts of fan fiction, fan art and fan songs. A notable fan work, Heat Waves, which is a Dream SMP-related fan fiction series hosted on Archive of Our Own, reached the top three in kudos on the website. It is named after the song "Heat Waves" by Glass Animals, and is suggested to be one of the reasons the song topped the 2020 Triple J Hottest 100 countdown in Australia.

"Dream SMP" was listed as a genre in Spotify Wrapped in late 2021. The genre encompasses fan-created music about the events of the server, music made by Dream SMP members, and music used in Dream SMP streams, but largely was used as a catch all for "Youtuber Music". The artists that are part of the genre include Glass Animals, Wilbur Soot, Toby Fox, and Alec Benjamin. It has recently been renamed to "Pixel".

The server was visited by several notable guest stars, including KSI, Vikkstar123, LazarBeam, Ninja, Lil Nas X, Pokimane, Corpse Husband, and MrBeast. MrBeast staged a game on the server by hiding gift cards worth  for Dream SMP members to find.

Cast 
List adapted primarily from Dot Esports.

Main cast

Founding members
Dream
GeorgeNotFound
Callahan
Sapnap

Subsequent members

Former members 
Aimsy (2022) 
ItsAlyssa (2020) 
Jikishi (2021) 
Manatreed (2022) 
Technoblade (2020–2022)

Guest appearances 
 Andrea Botez
 Corpse Husband
 Dream's Sister (nicknamed "Drista" by TommyInnit)
 Iskall85
 JustVurb
 KSI
 Tubbo's sister, Lani (known online as "LanuSky"; nicknamed "Trista", "Tubsta", and "Tubbling")
 Lil Nas X
 Michael Clifford
 MrBeast
 Ninja
 Pokimane
 Karl Jacobs' brother, Sean
 Skeppy's assistant, Lya (who pretended to be Skeppy's sister; nicknamed "Skepina")
 Spifey
 Zelk
 Ph1LzA's wife, Kristin (known online as "Misstrixtin": nicknamed "Trixin", and "Mumza")

Notes

References

External links 
 
 The Dream SMP - An Epic for the Modern Era | YouTube Culture & Trends Report

Minecraft servers
Internet properties established in 2020
Improvisational theatre
Livestreaming
Role-playing